Zalar is a surname. The surname means "cottager", or tenant. The word comes from Austrian & German languages. Notable people with the surname include:

Miro Zalar (born 1957), Swedish pole vaulter
Tasia Zalar (born 1992), indigenous Australian actress
Živko Zalar (born 1948), Croatian cinematographer

References

Slovene-language surnames